Hunky and Spunky were fictional characters, appearing in the series of animated short subjects produced by Fleischer Studios for Paramount Pictures from 1938 to 1941. Filmed in Technicolor (three-strip), the series revolves around a mother burro and her son.

History

Hunky is a mother burro and Spunky is her young son. The initial film, titled Hunky and Spunky, takes place in the Old West, where a prospector attempts to make Spunky into his pack animal. Hunky and Spunky was nominated for the 1938 Academy Award for Best Short Subject (Cartoons). A positive contemporary review of Hunky and Spunky in Film Daily praised the short for introducing "funny new characters", and stated that the short's device of having the animals speak in "donkey talk" "will amuse the kids".

Fleischer Studios went on to produce six more cartoons featuring Hunky and Spunky: Always Kickin' (1939), The Barnyard Brat (1939), A Kick in Time (1940), Snubbed by a Snob (1940), You Can't Shoe a Horse Fly (1940), and Vitamin Hay (1941).

After Famous Studios succeeded Fleischer Studios in 1942, they revived the Spunky character alone for three animated shorts in their Noveltoons series: The patriotic Yankee Doodle Donkey (1944), in a supporting role to Casper the Friendly Ghost in Boo Kind To Animals (1955), and in a simplified drawing style in Okey Dokey Donkey (1958). A donkey which looks similar to Spunky has a cameo role in the 1957 Casper cartoon Ghost of Honor.

Filmography

Color Classics

Noveltoons

Casper The Friendly Ghost

References

External links
Hunky and Spunky at Don Markstein's Toonopedia.  at Don Markstein's Toonopedia. Archived from the original February 6, 2015.

Film characters introduced in 1938
Film series introduced in 1938
Fleischer Studios series and characters
Television series by U.M. & M. TV Corporation
Fictional donkeys
Animated duos
Animated film series
Children's film series